Oxfordshire County Cricket Club was established on 14 December 1921; prior to that a county club had existed before, with Oxfordshire competing in the first two Minor Counties Championship's in 1895 and 1896, and an Oxfordshire side also appeared in the competition from 1900 to 1906. It has since played minor counties cricket from 1922 and played List A cricket from 1967 to 2003, using a different number of home grounds during that time. Their first home minor counties fixture in 1895 was against Worcestershire at Christ Church Ground, Oxford, while their first home List A match came 75 years later, also against Worcestershire, in the 1970 Gillette Cup at Morris Motors Sports Ground, Cowley.

The thirty grounds that Oxfordshire have used for home matches since 1895 are listed below, with statistics complete through to the end of the 2014 season.

Grounds

List A
Below is a complete list of grounds used by Oxfordshire County Cricket Club when it was permitted to play List A matches. These grounds have also held Minor Counties Championship and MCCA Knockout Trophy matches.

Minor Counties
Below is a complete list of grounds used by Oxfordshire County Cricket Club in Minor Counties Championship and MCCA Knockout Trophy matches.

Notes

References

Oxfordshire County Cricket Club
Cricket grounds in Oxfordshire
Oxfordshire